Acacia rhetinocarpa, commonly known as neat wattle or resin wattle, is a shrub belonging to the genus Acacia and the subgenus Phyllodineae native to southern Australia. It was listed as vulnerable under the Environment Protection and Biodiversity Conservation Act 1999 in 2013.

Description
It has inequilaterally obtriangular-obovate to widely obovate-obdeltate green phyllodes.

It blooms between August and October but flowers can appear as late as March. It produces simple inflorescences of spherical flower-heads containing 12 to 15 bright yellow flowers.

The shrub is thought to be wind-pollinated and ants thought to be the main agent of seed dispersal (myrmechory) while germination is most likely to result from land disturbance or fire.

Taxonomy
The species was first formally described by the botanist John McConnell Black in 1920 as part of the work Additions to the flora of South Australia as published in the Transactions and Proceedings of the Royal Society of South Australia. It was reclassified as Racosperma rhetinocarpum by Leslie Pedley in 2003 and transferred back to genus Acacia in 2005.

The specific epithet is taken from the Greek words  meaning resin or gum and  meaning fruit in reference to the resinous nature of the seed pods.

Distribution
It is endemic to some small areas on the Eyre Peninsula in South Australia near Arno Bay extending to the Yorke Peninsula near Curramulka and then between the Gilbert River and Monarto where it is found growing in calcareous sandy or sandy-loamy soils as a part of open scrubland communities that are dominated by Eucalyptus species.

See also
 List of Acacia species

References

rhetinocarpa
Flora of South Australia
Plants described in 1920
Taxa named by John McConnell Black